Senator Lewis may refer to:

Members of the United States Senate
Dixon Hall Lewis (1802–1848), U.S. Senator from Alabama from 1844 to 1848
J. Hamilton Lewis (1863–1939), U.S. Senator from Illinois from 1931 to 1939 
John F. Lewis (1818–1895), U.S. Senator from Virginia 1870 to 1875

United States state senate members
Albert B. Lewis (1925–2021), New York State Senate
Bob Lewis (politician) (1925–2015), Washington State Senate
Bonnie Titcomb Lewis, Maine State Senate
Brian J. Lewis (born 1929), Washington State Senate
Dave Lewis (politician) (born 1942), Montana State Senate
David John Lewis (1869–1952), Maryland State Senate 
Earl Ramage Lewis (1887–1956), Ohio State Senate
H. Craig Lewis (1944–2013), Pennsylvania State Senate
Helmar Lewis (1900–1999), Wisconsin State Senate
James T. Lewis (1819–1904), Wisconsin State Senate
James Lewis (Indiana politician) (1930–2016), Indiana State Senate
Jason Lewis (Massachusetts politician) (born 1968), Massachusetts State Senate
Jerry Lewis (Arizona politician) (born 1956), Arizona State Senate
John W. Lewis Jr. (1906–1977), Illinois State Senate
John Lewis (California politician) (born 1954), California State Senate
Loran L. Lewis (1825–1916), New York State Senate
Morgan Lewis (governor) (1754–1844), New York State Senate
Robert S. Lewis (1856–1956), North Dakota State Senate
Thomas Lewis (Kentucky politician) (1749–1809), Kentucky State Senate
William Lewis (New York politician) (1827–1891), New York State Senate

Other
John Wood Lewis Sr. (1801–1865), Confederate States Senator from Georgia from 1862 to 1863